NPO Radio 2 Soul & Jazz is a digital radio station from Netherlands Public Broadcasting (NPO).

It launched as NPO Radio 6 on 4 September 2006, when it took over from the Concertzender (now operating independently), its musical format is mainly soul and jazz, together with such related genres as funk, rhythm and blues, and world music. At night it also broadcasts a number of cultural and informative programmes produced by the following broadcasting associations: KRO-NCRV, MAX, NTR and VPRO. NPO Soul & Jazz is distributed via DAB, cable, and also online.

On 1 January 2016 NPO closed down NPO Radio 6, replacing it with NPO Soul & Jazz. NPO Radio 2 Soul & Jazz broadcast non stop music till 19 hrs. Between 19 and 23 hrs there are presented programmes on NPO Soul & Jazz.

Logos

See also
 List of radio stations in the Netherlands

External links
 NPO Soul & Jazz website

Radio stations in the Netherlands
Radio stations established in 2006